Svárovský and its variations are Czech surnames.

 Daniel Swarovski (1862–1956), a Czech-Austrian businessman and co-founder of Austrian glass producer Swarovski 
 Fiona Swarovski
 Fyodor Svarovsky (born 1971), Russian poet and journalist
 Gernot Langes-Swarovski (born 1943), an Austrian businessman, relative of Daniel; see  Gernot Langes-Swarovski (de)
 Hans Swarowsky (1899–1975), a Hungarian-Austrian conductor
 Leoš Svárovský (born 1961), a Czech conductor
 Marli Swarowsky (born 1948), a Brazilian artist
 Markus Langes-Swarovski (born 1974), an Austrian businessman, relative of Daniel; see  Markus Langes-Swarovski (de)
 Manfred Swarovski, Austrian businessman, relative of Daniel, see Swarco Holding (de) 
 Nadja Swarovski
 Petr Svárovský

See also 
 Svárov (disambiguation)
 Swarovski (disambiguation)

Czech-language surnames